Commandant Blaison (F793) is a  in the French Navy.

Design 

Armed by a crew of 90 sailors, these vessels have the reputation of being among the most difficult in bad weather. Their high windage makes them particularly sensitive to pitch and roll as soon as the sea is formed.

Their armament, consequent for a vessel of this tonnage, allows them to manage a large spectrum of missions. During the Cold War, they were primarily used to patrol the continental shelf of the Atlantic Ocean in search of Soviet Navy submarines. Due to the poor performance of the hull sonar, as soon as an echo appeared, the reinforcement of an ASM frigate was necessary to chase it using its towed variable depth sonar.

Their role as patrollers now consists mainly of patrols and assistance missions, as well as participation in UN missions (blockades, flag checks) or similar marine policing tasks (fight against drugs, extraction of nationals, fisheries control, etc.). The Exocet missiles have been landed, but they carry several machine guns which are more suited to their new missions.

Its construction cost was estimated at 270,000,000 French francs.

Construction and career 
Commandant Blaison was laid down on 15 November 1979 at Arsenal de Lorient, Lorient. Launched on 7 March 1981 and commissioned on 28 April 1982.

She is scheduled to be withdrawn from service in 2027 and be replaced by one of a new class of ocean-going Patrol Vessels (the Patrouilleurs Océanique).

Citations 

Ships built in Lorient
1981 ships
D'Estienne d'Orves-class avisos